The 37th Kerala Film Critics Association Awards, honouring the best Malayalam films released in 2013, were announced in January 2014.

Winners

Main Awards
 Best Film: Drishyam
 Best Director: Jeethu Joseph (Drishyam)
 Best Actor: Mohanlal (Drishyam)
 Best Actress: Remya Nambeesan (English: An Autumn in London, Nadan)
 Second Best Film: Ayaal
 Second Best Actor: Mukesh (English: An Autumn in London, Vasanthathinte Kanalvazhikal)
 Second Best Actress: Mallika (Kadhaveedu)
 Best Screenplay: P. Ananthapadmanabhan (August Club)
 Best Music Director: Ratheesh Vega (Orissa)
 Best Lyricist: Prabhavarma and Madhu Vasudevan (Nadan)
 Best Male Playback Singer: Najeem Arshad (Drishyam, Immanuel)
 Best Female Playback Singer: Jyotsna (Zachariyayude Garbhinikal)
 Best Cinematographer: Udayan Ambadi (English)
 Best Child Artist: Sanoop Santhosh (Philips and the Monkey Pen)
 Best Editing: Sobin K Soman (Ayal)
 Best Recording: Tapas Nayik (Nadan)
 Upcoming Actor: Niranjay (Black Butterfly)
 Upcoming Director: Sajin Babu (Astamayam Vare), Abin Jacob (Thompson Villa), Krishnajith S Vijayan (Flat No 4B) and Vinod Kumar (Test Paper)
 Best Popular Film: Amen

Special Jury Awards
 Special Jury Award – Film: Orissa, Kunthapura, Vasanthathinte Kanalvazhikal and Pakaram

Honourary Awards 
 Chalachitra Ratnam Award: K. R. Vijaya
 Chalachitra Prathibha Award: T. G. Ravi, Mala Aravindan, A. J. Joseph

References

External links
 "List of recipients of the Kerala Film Critics Association Awards" (in Malayalam)

2013 Indian film awards
2013